Several methods have been suggested for comparing the greatest chess players in history. There is agreement on a statistical system to rate the strengths of current players, called the Elo system, but disagreement about methods used to compare players from different generations who never competed against each other.

Statistical methods

Elo system

The best-known statistical method was devised by Arpad Elo in 1960 and elaborated on in his 1978 book The Rating of Chessplayers, Past and Present. He gave ratings to players corresponding to their performance over the best five-year span of their career. According to this system the highest ratings achieved were:

 2725: José Raúl Capablanca
 2720: Mikhail Botvinnik, Emanuel Lasker
 2700: Mikhail Tal
 2690: Alexander Alekhine, Paul Morphy, Vasily Smyslov

Though published in 1978, Elo's list did not include five-year averages for later players Bobby Fischer and Anatoly Karpov. It did list January 1978 ratings of 2780 for Fischer and 2725 for Karpov.

In 1970, FIDE adopted Elo's system for rating current players, so one way to compare players of different eras is to compare their Elo ratings. The best-ever Elo ratings are tabulated below.

As of December 2015, there were 101 chess players in history who broke 2700, and fourteen of them exceeded 2800. The high peak ratings of Fischer, Karpov, and Kasparov are notable for being achieved last century (1972, 1994, and 1999 respectively). However, Fischer and Karpov are no longer in the top 20.

{| class="wikitable sortable" style="font-size:100%;"
|+Table of top 20 rated players of all-time, with date their best ratings were first achieved
!Rank
!Rating
!Player
!Date
!Age

|- style="text-align: center;"
|011
| 2882
| style="text-align: left;" | Magnus Carlsen
|2014-05May 2014
|

|- style="text-align: center;"
|022
| 2851
| style="text-align: left;" | Garry Kasparov
|1999-07July 1999
|

|- style="text-align: center;"
|033
| 2844
| style="text-align: left;" | Fabiano Caruana
|2014-10October 2014
|

|- style="text-align: center;"
|044
| 2830
| style="text-align: left;" | Levon Aronian
|2014-03March 2014
|

|- style="text-align: center;"
|055 
| 2822
| style="text-align: left;" | Wesley So
|2017-02February 2017
|

|- style="text-align: center;"
|066
| 2820
| style="text-align: left;" | Shakhriyar Mamedyarov
|2018-09September 2018
|

|- style="text-align: center;"
|077
| 2819
| style="text-align: left;" | Maxime Vachier-Lagrave
|2016-08 August 2016
|

|- style="text-align: center;"
|088 (tie)
| 2817
| style="text-align: left;" | Viswanathan Anand
|2011-03March 2011
|

|- style="text-align: center;"
|088 (tie)
| 2817
| style="text-align: left;" | Vladimir Kramnik
| |2016-10October 2016
|

|- style="text-align: center;"
|1010 (tie)
| 2816
| style="text-align: left;" | Veselin Topalov
|2015–07July 2015
|

|- style="text-align: center;"
|1010 (tie)
| 2816
| style="text-align: left;" | Hikaru Nakamura
|2015-10October 2015
|

|- style="text-align: center;"
|1010 (tie)
| 2816
| style="text-align: left;" | Ding Liren
|2018-11November 2018
|

|- style="text-align: center;"
|1313
| 2810
| style="text-align: left;" | Alexander Grischuk
|2014-12December 2014
|

|- style="text-align: center;"
|1414
| 2804
| style="text-align: left;" | Alireza Firouzja
|2021-11December 2021
|

|- style="text-align: center;"
|1515 
| 2798
| style="text-align: left;" | Anish Giri
|2015-10October 2015
|

|- style="text-align: center;"
|1616 (tie)
| 2793
| style="text-align: left;" | Teimour Radjabov
|2012-11November 2012
|

|- style="text-align: center;"
|1616 (tie)
| 2793
| style="text-align: left;" | Ian Nepomniachtchi
|2022-10October 2022
|

|- style="text-align: center;"
|1818 (tie)
| 2788
| style="text-align: left;" | Alexander Morozevich
|2008-07July 2008
|

|- style="text-align: center;"
|1818 (tie)
| 2788
| style="text-align: left;" | Sergey Karjakin
|2011-07July 2011
|

|- style="text-align: center;"
|2020
| 2787
| style="text-align: left;" | Vassily Ivanchuk
|2007–10October 2007
|

|- style="text-align: center;"
|}

Average rating over time 
The average Elo rating of top players has risen over time. For instance, the average of the top 10 active players rose from 2751 in July 2000 to 2794 in July 2014, a 43-point increase in 14 years. The average rating of the top 100 players, meanwhile, increased from 2644  to 2703, a 59-point increase. Many people believe that this rise is mostly due to an anomaly known as ratings inflation, making it impractical to compare players of different eras.

Elo said it was futile to attempt to use ratings to compare players from different eras and that they could only measure the strength of a player as compared to their contemporaries. He also stated that the process of rating players was in any case rather approximate - he compared it to "the measurement of the position of a cork bobbing up and down on the surface of agitated water with a yard stick tied to a rope and which is swaying in the wind".

Chessmetrics

Many statisticians besides Elo have devised similar methods to retrospectively rate players. Jeff Sonas' rating system is called "Chessmetrics". This system takes account of many games played after the publication of Elo's book, and claims to take account of the rating inflation that the Elo system has allegedly suffered.

One caveat is that a Chessmetrics rating takes into account the frequency of play. According to Sonas, "As soon as you go a month without playing, your Chessmetrics rating will start to drop."

Sonas, like Elo, claims that it is impossible to compare the strength of players from different eras, saying:

Nevertheless, Sonas' website does compare players from different eras. Including data until December 2004, the ratings were:

In 2005, Sonas used Chessmetrics to evaluate historical annual performance ratings and came to the conclusion that Kasparov was dominant for the most years, followed by Karpov and Lasker. He also published the following list of the highest ratings ever attained according to calculations done at the start of each month:

{| class="wikitable sortable" style="font-size:100%;"
!Rank
!Rating
!Player
|-
| align=center | 1
| align=center | 2895
| Bobby Fischer
|-
| align=center | 2
| align=center | 2886
| Garry Kasparov
|-
| align=center | 3
| align=center | 2885
| Mikhail Botvinnik
|-
| align=center | 4
| align=center | 2878
| Emanuel Lasker
|-
| align=center | 5
| align=center | 2877
| José Capablanca
|-
| align=center | 6
| align=center | 2860
| Alexander Alekhine
|-
| align=center | 7
| align=center | 2848
| Anatoly Karpov
|-
| align=center | 8
| align=center | 2833
| Viswanathan Anand
|-
| align=center | 9
| align=center | 2826
| Vladimir Kramnik
|-
| align=center | 10
| align=center | 2826
| Wilhelm Steinitz
|}

Warriors of the Mind
In contrast to Elo and Sonas's systems, Raymond Keene and Nathan Divinsky's book Warriors of the Mind attempts to establish a rating system claiming to compare directly the strength of players active in different eras, and so determine the strongest player of all time (through December 2004). Considering games played between sixty-four of the strongest players in history, they came up with the following top ten:

Garry Kasparov, 3096
Anatoly Karpov, 2876
Bobby Fischer, 2690
Mikhail Botvinnik, 2616
José Raúl Capablanca, 2552
Emanuel Lasker, 2550
Viktor Korchnoi, 2535
Boris Spassky, 2480
Vasily Smyslov, 2413
Tigran Petrosian, 2363

These "Divinsky numbers" are not on the same scale as Elo ratings (the last person on the list, Johannes Zukertort, has a Divinsky number of 873, which would be a beginner-level Elo rating). Keene and Divinsky's system has met with limited acceptance, and Warriors of the Mind has been accused of arbitrarily selecting players and bias towards modern players.

Moves played compared with computer choices 
The idea of this approach is to compare the moves played by humans to top engine moves, with the rationale that players more likely to choose these moves are also stronger.

Early efforts
A computer-based method of analyzing chess abilities across history came from Matej Guid and Ivan Bratko at the University of Ljubljana, Slovenia, in 2006. 
A similar project was conducted for World Champions in 2007–08 using Rybka 2.3.2a (then-strongest chess program) and a modified version of Guid and Bratko's program "Crafty". 
CAPS (Computer Aggregated Precision Score) is a system created by Chess.com that compares players from different eras by finding the percentage of moves that matches that of a chess engine.

Markovian model 
In 2017, Jean-Marc Alliot of the Toulouse Computer Science Research Institute (IRIT) presented a new method, based on a Markovian interpretation of a chess game. Starting with those of Wilhelm Steinitz, all 26,000 games played since then by chess world champions have been processed by a supercomputer using the Stockfish chess engine (rated above 3310 Elo).
 
These predictions have proven not only to be extremely close to the actual results when players have played concrete games against one another, but to also fare better than those based on Elo scores. The results demonstrate that the level of chess players has been steadily increasing. Magnus Carlsen (in 2013) tops the list, while Vladimir Kramnik (in 1999) is second, Bobby Fischer (in 1971) is third, and Garry Kasparov (in 2001) is fourth.

Subjective lists
Many prominent players and chess writers have offered their own rankings of players.

Bobby Fischer (1964 and 1970)
In 1964, Bobby Fischer listed his top 10 in Chessworld magazine: Morphy, Staunton, Steinitz, Tarrasch, Chigorin, Alekhine, Capablanca, Spassky, Tal, and Reshevsky.  He considered Morphy to be "perhaps the most accurate", writing: "In a set match he would beat anyone alive today."

In 1970, Fischer named Morphy, Steinitz, Capablanca, Botvinnik, Petrosian, Tal, Spassky, Reshevsky, Svetozar Gligorić and Bent Larsen the greatest chess players in history.

Irving Chernev (1974)
In 1974, popular chess author Irving Chernev published an article titled Who were the greatest? in the English magazine CHESS. He followed this up with his 1976 book The Golden Dozen, in which he ranked his all-time top twelve: 1. Capablanca, 2. Alekhine, 3. Lasker, 4. Fischer, 5. Botvinnik, 6. Petrosian, 7. Tal, 8. Smyslov, 9. Spassky, 10. Bronstein, 11. Rubinstein, and 12. Nimzowitsch.

Miguel Quinteros (1992)
In a 1992 interview GM Miguel Quinteros gave the opinion: "I think Fischer was and still is the greatest chess player of all time. [...] During his absence other good chess players have appeared. But no one equals Fischer's talent and perfection."

Viswanathan Anand (2000, 2008 and 2012) 
In 2000, when Karpov, Korchnoi and Kasparov were still active, Anand listed his top 10 as: Fischer, Morphy, Lasker, Capablanca, Steinitz, Tal, Korchnoi, Keres, Karpov and Kasparov.

When interviewed in 2008 shortly after Fischer's death, he ranked Fischer and Kasparov as the greatest, with Kasparov a little ahead by virtue of being on top for so many years.

In 2012, Anand stated that he considered Fischer the best player and also the greatest, because of the hurdles he faced.

Chess Informant readers (2001)
Svetozar Gligorić reported in his book Shall We Play Fischerandom Chess?  (Batsford, 2002):At the beginning of 2001 a large poll for the "Ten Greatest Chess Players of the 20th Century, selected by Chess Informant readers" resulted in Fischer having the highest percentage of votes and finishing as No. 1, ahead of Kasparov, Alekhine, Capablanca, Botvinnik, Karpov, Tal, Lasker, Anand and Korchnoi.

David Edmonds and John Eidinow (2004)
BBC award-winning journalists, from their book Bobby Fischer Goes to War: How the Soviets Lost the Most Extraordinary Chess Match of All Time  (HarperCollins, 2004): Fischer, some will maintain, was the outstanding player in chess history, though there are powerful advocates too for Lasker, Capablanca, Alekhine, and Kasparov. Many chess players will dismiss such comparisons as meaningless, akin to the futile attempt to grade the supreme musicians of all time. But the manner in which Fischer stormed his way to Reykjavik, his breathtaking dominance at the Palma de Majorca Interzonal, the trouncings of Taimanov, Larsen, and Petrosian—all this was unprecedented. There never has been an era in modern chess during which one player has so overshadowed all others.

Vladimir Kramnik (2005 and 2011) 
In a 2005 interview, Vladimir Kramnik (World Champion from 2000 to 2007) did not name a greatest player, but stated: "The other world champions had something 'missing'. I can't say the same about Kasparov: he can do everything."

In an interview in 2011, Vladimir Kramnik said about Anand: "I always considered him to be a colossal talent, one of the greatest in the whole history of chess", "I think that in terms of play Anand is in no way weaker than Kasparov",  and "In the last 5–6 years he's made a qualitative leap that's made it possible to consider him one of the great chess players".

Leonard Barden (2008)
In his 2008 obituary of Bobby Fischer, Leonard Barden wrote that most experts ranked Kasparov as the best ever player, with probably Fischer second and Karpov third.

Levon Aronian (2012, 2015, and 2022) 
In a 2012 interview, Levon Aronian stated that he considers Alexander Alekhine the best player of all time.

In a 2015 interview after the 8th round of the Sinquefield Cup, Levon Aronian stated that he considers Garry Kasparov the strongest player of all time.

In a 2022 interview after the 5th round of the first leg in FIDE Grand Prix 2022, when asked if he thought that in the future Garry Kasparov or Magnus Carlsen would be considered the 'GOAT' (Greatest Of All Time), Levon Aronian stated that "I kind of feel that Magnus will be the greatest for a long long time, because for me he is probably already the greatest but it is still continuing. It will take a long time to beat his achievements."

Magnus Carlsen (2012, 2015, 2020 and 2021) 
In 2012, Magnus Carlsen said that Kasparov is the greatest player of all time, adding that while Fischer may have been better at his best, Kasparov remained at the top for much longer.

In December 2015 he said he would like to play Fischer and Kasparov at their peak performance.

In January 2020, Carlsen said, "Kasparov had 20 years uninterrupted as the world No 1. And I would say for very few of those years was there any doubt that he was the best player. He must be considered as the best in history." He made a similar claim in 2021, saying "Garry Kasparov, in my opinion, the greatest player there's ever been..."

Hikaru Nakamura (2021) 
In 2021, Hikaru Nakamura published a youtube video entitled "Hikaru's Hot Takes on the Ten Best Chess Players of All Time" in which he reviewed a chess.com article on "The 10 Best Chess Players Of All Time." In this video he suggested that it was unfair to exclude Paul Morphy and Viswanathan Anand from the 10 greatest players of all time. Hikaru stated that Bobby Fischer should "obviously be number 3" and that Garry Kasparov and Magnus Carlsen should be at number 1 and number 2 respectively with the caveat that Kasparov is only number 1 due to his time as number 1 in the world being greater than Carlsen's. At the end of the video, Hikaru said he "can live with" the top 5 as: Kasparov, Carlsen, Fischer, Capablanca and Karpov but he would put from 6 through 10: Anand, Kramnik, Botvinnik, Lasker, Morphy.

World Champions by world title reigns

The table below organises the world champions in order of championship wins. (For the purpose of this table, a successful defence counts as a win, even if the match was drawn.) The table is made more complicated by the split between the "Classical" and FIDE world titles between 1993 and 2006.

See also

List of FIDE chess world number ones

References

External links
 

Comparison of top chess players
History of chess
Chess rating systems
Comparison of sports